Bryan Andrew Garner (born November 17, 1958) is an American legal scholar and lexicographer. He has written more than two dozen books about English usage and style such as Garner's Modern English Usage for a general audience, and others for legal professionals. Garner also wrote two books with Justice Antonin Scalia: Making Your Case: The Art of Persuading Judges (2008) and Reading Law: The Interpretation of Legal Texts (2012). He is the founder and president of LawProse Inc. 

Garner serves as Distinguished Research Professor of Law at Southern Methodist University Dedman School of Law. He is also a lecturer at his alma mater, the University of Texas School of Law.

Early life and education
Garner was born on November 17, 1958, in Lubbock, Texas, and raised in Canyon, Texas. He attended the University of Texas at Austin, where he published excerpts from his senior thesis, notably "Shakespeare's Latinate Neologisms" and "Latin-Saxon Hybrids in Shakespeare and the Bible".

After receiving his Bachelor of Arts degree, Garner entered the University of Texas School of Law, where he served as an associate editor of the Texas Law Review.

Career
After receiving his Juris Doctor degree in 1984, he clerked for Judge Thomas M. Reavley of the U.S. Court of Appeals for the Fifth Circuit before he joined the Dallas firm of Carrington, Coleman, Sloman & Blumenthal. He then returned to the University of Texas School of Law and was named director of the Texas/Oxford Center for Legal Lexicography.

In 1990, he left the university to found LawProse Inc., which provides seminars on clear writing, briefing and editing for lawyers and judges.

Garner has taught at the University of Texas School of Law, the UC Berkeley School of Law, Texas Tech University School of Law, and Texas A&M University School of Law. He has been awarded three honorary doctorates from Stetson, La Verne, and Thomas M. Cooley Law School. He serves on the Board of Advisers of The Green Bag.

Author
As a student at the University of Texas School of Law in 1981, Garner began noticing odd usages in lawbooks, many of them dating back to Shakespeare. They became the source material for his first book, A Dictionary of Modern Legal Usage (1987).  Since 1990, his work has focused on teaching the legal profession clear writing techniques.

In books, articles,
 and lectures, Garner has tried to reform the way bibliographic references are "interlarded" (interwoven) in the midst of textual analysis. He argues for putting citations in footnotes and notes that in-text information that is important but non-bibliographic. He opposes references such as "457 U.S. 423, 432, 102 S.Ct. 2515, 2521, 89 L.Ed.2d 744, 747" as interruptions in the middle of a line. However, such interruptions in judges' opinions and in lawyers' briefs have remained the norm. Some courts and advocates around the country have begun adopting Garner's recommended style of footnoted citations, and a surprising degree of internal strife has resulted within some organizations. For example, one appellate judge in Louisiana refused to join in a colleague's opinions written in the new format.

Garner says that one of the main reasons for the reform is to make legal writing more comprehensible to readers who lack a legal education. That has attracted opposition, most notably from Judge Richard Posner of the U.S. Court of Appeals for the Seventh Circuit, and from his co-author, Justice Antonin Scalia.

Since 1992, Garner has contributed numerous revisions to the field of procedural rules, when he began revising all amendments to the sets of Federal Rules (Civil, Appellate, Evidence, Bankruptcy, and Criminal) for the Judicial Conference of the United States.

Garner and Justice Scalia wrote Making Your Case: The Art of Persuading Judges (2008). Garner maintains a legal consulting practice, focusing on issues in statutory construction and contractual interpretation.

English grammar and usage
Garner's books on English usage include Garner's Modern English Usage. This dictionary was the subject of David Foster Wallace's essay "Authority and American Usage" in Consider the Lobster and Other Essays, originally published in the April 2001 issue of Harper's Magazine.  In 2003, Garner contributed a chapter on grammar and usage to the 15th edition of The Chicago Manual of Style, and later editions have retained it.

Black's Law Dictionary 
In 1995, Garner became the editor in chief of Black's Law Dictionary.  He created a panel of international legal experts to improve the specialized vocabulary in the book. Garner and the panel rewrote and expanded the dictionary's lexicographic information.

Bibliography
Only current editions are shown.
 Nino and Me: My Unusual Friendship with Justice Antonin Scalia (2017). Threshold Editions. 
 The Chicago Guide to Grammar, Usage, and Punctuation (2016; an expanded version of his chapter in The Chicago Manual of Style)
 Garner's Modern English Usage (4th ed. 2016)
 The Rules of Golf in Plain English (with Jeffrey S. Kuhn, 4th ed. 2016)
 Black's Law Dictionary (11th ed. 2019; abr. 10th ed. 2015; and 5th pocket ed. 2016)
 Guidelines for Drafting and Editing Legislation (2015)
 The Winning Brief: 100 Tips for Persuasive Briefing in Trial and Appellate Courts (3rd ed. 2014)
 HBR Guide to Better Business Writing (2013)
 Legal Writing in Plain English: A Text with Exercises (2nd ed. 2013)
 Quack This Way: David Foster Wallace & Bryan A. Garner Talk Language and Writing (transcript of an interview with David Foster Wallace, 2013). RosePen Books. 
 The Redbook: A Manual on Legal Style (3rd ed. 2013)
 Reading Law: The Interpretation of Legal Texts (with Justice Antonin Scalia, 2012)
 Garner's Dictionary of Legal Usage (3rd ed. 2011)
 The Chicago Manual of Style, Ch. 5 "Grammar and Usage," (16th ed. 2010)
 Ethical Communications for Lawyers: Upholding Professional Responsibility (2009). LawProse, Inc. 
 Garner on Language and Writing: Selected Essays and Speeches of Bryan A. Garner (foreword by Justice Ruth Bader Ginsburg, 2009). American Bar Association. 
 The Winning Oral Argument: Enduring Principles with Supporting Comments from the Literature (2nd ed. 2009)
 Making Your Case: The Art of Persuading Judges (with Justice Antonin Scalia, 2008)
 A New Miscellany-at-Law: Yet Another Diversion for Lawyers and Others (by Robert Megarry, Garner ed., 2005). Hart. 
 The Elements of Legal Style (2nd ed. 2002)
 Guidelines for Drafting and Editing Court Rules (2002)
 A Handbook of Family Law Terms (2001). West Group. 
 A Handbook of Criminal Law Terms (2000). West Group. 
 The Oxford Dictionary of American Usage and Style (2000; an abridged version of A Dictionary of Modern American Usage, 1st ed. 1998)
 A Handbook of Basic Law Terms (1999). West Group. 
 A Handbook of Business Law Terms (1999). West Group. 
 Securities Disclosure in Plain English (1999). CCH Inc. 
 Texas, Our Texas: Remembrances of The University (1984).  (editor)

See also
 Skunked term

Notes

References

External links
 LawProse
 Interview  with Garner on KERA 90.1. The mp3 podcast of the interview is available at: 1 and Hour 2.
 Biography at the Texas Law Review
 "Clearing the Cobwebs on Judicial Opinion", from the Summer 2001 issue of Court Review 21
 

Living people
1958 births
People from Lubbock, Texas
University of Texas at Austin alumni
American lawyers
American legal scholars
American legal writers
American lexicographers
Legal educators
Golf writers and broadcasters
Plain English
Writers of style guides
University of Texas School of Law faculty
Southern Methodist University faculty
People from Canyon, Texas